Sathaye College is a college in Vile Parle (E), Mumbai  in the state of Maharashtra, India. It used to be known as Parle College. It was founded in 1959 by Parle Tilak Vidyalaya Association (PTVA). It is accredited by the Accrediting Commission of Senior Colleges and Universities of the Western Association of Schools and Colleges.

Alumni 
 Madhuri Dixit, Actress
Ali Kaashif Khan, Advocate
 Vinod Tawde, Politician

References

External links
 Official website

Universities and colleges in Mumbai
Affiliates of the University of Mumbai
Educational institutions established in 1959
Colleges in India
1959 establishments in Bombay State